"#34" is a song by the Dave Matthews Band, featured as an instrumental piece on their debut studio album, Under the Table and Dreaming.  The song was inspired by and written for Miguel Valdez, a percussionist who collaborated with the band in 1992 and died of hepatitis in 1993.  Dave Matthews co-wrote the song with LeRoi Moore, Carter Beauford and Haines Fullerton, another collaborator, who later committed suicide in September 1996.  On the album, the song is "hidden" as track number 34, with 22 blank tracks between it and the previous track, "Pay for What You Get."

History
The song's name stems from the fact that it was the thirty-fourth one recorded by the band, similar to their later songs "#36," "#40," and "#41." It is in 27/8 time signature or 3 cycles of 9/8, and changes to 6/8 and 11/8 during the chorus. The song debuted live in February 1993 and was played a total of nine times at various shows up until March of that year. Each performance lasted around eight-and-a-half minutes and featured lyrics sung by Dave Matthews.  The lyrics of the song were unstructured and varied slightly throughout its nine live performances.  The theme of the song's lyrics were initially about love; however, they were later based around themes of death.   When the band recorded the song for Under the Table and Dreaming in September 1994, lyrics were recorded, but were removed for the album.

After the live performances in 1993 and the studio recording in 1994, "#34" had not been played live by the band, except for a small tease at the beginning of a show in 2002.
At the beginning of the band's summer tour in June 2005, the song was once teased again at two different shows, and then in July the song was almost completely played, but it was still much shorter than length of entire the song.  Finally, on July 9, 2005, "#34" was fully played again live for the first time in over 12 years; however, it was played instrumentally, similar to its version on the album.  The previous live performance of the song took place exactly 1442 shows prior, totaling a 4491-day period since the last performance, making it the band's all-time longest return of a live song performance.  "#34" returned for a total 11 performances that year in its instrumental form and can be found on the live album on Weekend on the Rocks, which is from the band's four-night stand at the Red Rocks Amphitheatre.

On October 2, during the band's final show for the 2007 Summer Tour at the Hollywood Bowl, "#34" returned for Dave's wife's 34th birthday. The return also marked the first time since 1993 that #34 had lyrics.

After LeRoi Moore died in August 2008, the song was used as the backing track to a photo and video montage of the musician that was played during the encore break of performances by the band at the last two venues of the 2008 summer tour.

After numerous teases of the song during the 2013 Summer Tour (notably on the 5th anniversary of Moore's last show with the band), the band brought back the song in full, with lyrics, playing it for the first time since October 2, 2007.

The song was played on September 7, 2018, Leroi Moore’s birthday, at Harvey’s Lake Tahoe Outdoor Arena in Stateline, NV.

References

1994 songs
Dave Matthews Band songs
Rock instrumentals
Songs written by Dave Matthews
Song recordings produced by Steve Lillywhite
Songs written by Carter Beauford
Songs written by LeRoi Moore